Billy in the Lion's Den is an album by guitarist Bill Jennings and saxophonist Leo Parker recorded in Cincinnati in 1954 and released on the King label.

Track listing 
All compositions by Bill Jennings and Leo Parker except where noted
 "Piccadilly Circus" (Bill Davis) – 2:01
 "May I?" (Harry Revel, Mack Gordon) – 2:53
 "Billy in the Lion's Den" – 2:54
 "Sweet and Lovely" (Gus Arnheim, Charles N. Daniels, Harry Tobias) – 3:35
 "There Will Never Be Another You" (Harry Warren, Gordon) – 2:53
 "Stuffy" (Coleman Hawkins) – 2:59
 "Just You, Just Me" (Jesse Greer, Raymond Klages) – 2:47
 "Down to Earth" – 2:20
 "What'll I Do" (Irving Berlin) – 3:50
 "Fine and Dandy" (Kay Swift, Paul James) – 2:29
 "Get Hot" – 2:27
 "Solitude" (Duke Ellington, Eddie DeLange, Irving Mills) – 2:50

Personnel 
Bill Jennings – guitar
Leo Parker – baritone saxophone
Andy Johnson – piano
Joe Williams – bass
George De Hart – drums

References 

Bill Jennings (guitarist) albums
Leo Parker albums
1957 albums
King Records (United States) albums